Low Transit Industries was an independent record label founded in Melbourne, Australia in 1999 by Darren Smallman (Dez Dare) and Simon Baird. The label toured and released bands across the world until 2010 when the partners closed operations due to Darren Smallman moving to the UK where he now runs BATTLE WORLDWIDE which is a record label, book publisher, music publisher and PR services company.

Artists
Artists who have had releases through Low Transit Industries include:
 Alma
 Aviator Lane
 Batrider
 Black Mountain
 Black Nielson
 Boddicker
 C.W. Stoneking
 Co-Pilgrim
 Disaster Plan
 Dishpan Fingers
 Elf Power
 Finishing School
 Fonda 500
 Fotomoto
 Ghosty
 Goldrush
 Homescience
 Ill Bravados
 Jacob S. Harris
 Jape Squad
 Kim Salmon & The Surrealists
 Legends of Motorsport
 Lilys
 Line Drawings
 Margins
 Matt Banham
 Mid State Orange
 New Estate
 New Pants
 No Through Road
 Of Montreal
 Okkervil River
 Oneironaut
 Papermoon
 Pink Mountaintops
 Royal City
 Russian Roulettes
 Sailboats Are White
 Sam Isaac
 Screamfeeder
 Season
 Serena Maneesh
 Shannon McArdle
 Sharko
 Sime Nugent
 Simon Llewelyn Evans
 Sneeze
 Sonoi
 SubAudible Hum
 Thalia Zedek Band
 The Backfeed Slumber
 The Bites
 The Ca$inos
 The Delicates
 The Essex Green
 The Ladybug Transistor
 The Loch Ness Mouse
 The Mendoza Line
 The Minders
 The Parkas
 The Smallgoods
 The Sound Platform
 The Specimens
 The Steinbecks
 The Super Wolfgang
 The Wells Collective
 THE WHATS
 The Zebras
 Tim Steward
 TimeZones
 Trans Am
 Tucker B's
 Warped
 We All Want To

Singles club
Low Transit Industries also briefly operated a singles club, periodically sending out split 7-inch singles to subscribers. Artists featured in the singles club included The Zebras, Sneeze, Disaster Plan, The Smallgoods, and The Ladybug Transistor.

See also 
 List of record labels

External links
 Official site

Low Transit Industries
Record labels established in 1999
Indie rock record labels
1999 establishments in Australia